Mikhail Wehbe (born Damascus, February 27, 1942) is a Syrian diplomat and former Permanent Representative of Syria to the United Nations. He is a Syrian Christian.

Education
Mikhail Wehbe was born in Damascus in 1942. He graduated from the Lebanese University with a Bachelor of Arts in Political Sciences and Public Administration. He also holds a Ph.D. in International law from Sofia University, Bulgaria. He has excellent command of four languages, Arabic, English, French and Bulgarian.

Career
Wehbe has served as the first secretary, Geneve, Switzerland, First Secretary, London, United Kingdom, Including as Permanent Representative of the Syrian Arab Republic to the United Nations New York, United States of America (1996-2003), Including as Ambassador of the Syrian Arab Republic to the United Nations Geneve, Switzerland ; Chief of the Private Offices Department and Member of the Consultative Council for Administrative and Management Affairs at the Ministry of Foreign Affairs of Syria (1988); Counselor and Minister Counselor of the Syrian Embassy in Sofia, Bulgaria (1982–88); and Chief of the Cabinet of the Minister of State for Foreign Affairs (1979-1982).

During his tenure at the United Nations he served twice as the President of the United Nations Security Council when Syria was holding a rotating seat at the council, in June 2002 and August 2003. He is currently serving as the Permanent Observer of the Arab League to the United Nations in Vienna, Austria.

References

External links

Syrian Christians
People from Damascus
1942 births
Living people
Permanent Representatives of Syria to the United Nations
Sofia University alumni
Lebanese University alumni